Franz Erwein, Count of Schönborn-Wiesentheid (1776–1840) was a German art collector and politician from the House of Schönborn.

Life
His parents were the Damian Hugo Erwein Franz von Schönborn (1738–1817), a chamberlain and member of the counsel from Aschaffenburg, and his wife Maria Anna (1746–1817), who had been countess of Stadion zu Thannhausen und Warthausen. From 1792 onwards he studied at Jura and the University of Würzburg. In 1802 he married Fernandine, Countess of Westphalia, from Hildesheim (1781-1813). She was the daughter of the imperial envoy Clemens August of Westphalia. That year Franz also took over the entail on the Schönborn-Besitzungen in the Holy Roman Empire.

In 1806 the county of Wiesentheid was handed over to the Kingdom of Bavaria as part of German Mediatisation. As a result, Franz Erwein von Schönborn mainly focused on administering his Frankish estates and those in the wine-growing areas of Rheingau. In 1811 he and his family moved to Munich, where he met Ludwig, Crown Prince of Bavaria the following year. He was given the rank of major general in the Bavarian army and began to operate as an art collector, making contact with several major artists.

On his wife's death in 1813, Schönborn moved to Schloss Gaibach, rebuilding it between 1800 and 1830. He also added a park in the English style, in which he built a Constitution Column. The column was designed by Schönborn's friend Leo von Klenze and commemorated Maximilian I Joseph's 1818 grant of a Constitution to the Kingdom of Bavaria. In 1828 he also completed a Constitution Hall in the castle, painted at von Klenze's suggestion by Carl Heinrich Hermann and Jakob Götzenberger, two of Peter von Cornelius's pupils. Schönborn's collection ranked alongside Ludwig's own as two of the most notable ones in southern Germany.

As a state counselor of Bavaria, Schönborn was a member of the state's Imperial Council from 1819 until his death. He sometimes served as Vice President of the Privy Council, in which capacity he represented the Council at the 1819 funeral of Anton Eggstein, the first Bavarian member of parliament to die in office. Schönborn was also hereditarily appointed as a member of the first chamber of the Nassau Landstände according to the Nassau Ducal Edict of 29 October 1831. He was elected from 1832 to 1837.

References

Bibliography
Constantin von Wurzbach: Schönborn, Erwein Franz Damian Graf. In: Biographisches Lexikon des Kaiserthums Oesterreich. Band 31. Verlag L. C. Zamarski, Wien 1876, S. 135 (Digitalisat).
Angelika Burger: Schönborn-Wiesentheid, Franz Erwein Graf von. In: Neue Deutsche Biographie (NDB). Band 23, Duncker & Humblot, Berlin 2007, S. 396 f. (Digitalisat).
Katharina Bott: Ein Kunstsammler zu Beginn des 19. Jahrhunderts: Franz Erwein Graf von Schönborn (1776–1840), Verlag für Geisteswissenschaften, Weimar, 1993; Rezension zum Buch
Cornelia Rösner: Nassauische Parlamentarier: Nassauische Parlamentarier. Teil 1. Der Landtag des Herzogtums Nassau 1818 - 1866, Wiesbaden 1997,

External links
Franz Erwein von Schönborn-Wiesentheid in the Parlamentsdatenbank in the 'Haus der Bayerischen Geschichte'

Members of the Bavarian Reichsrat
Politicians from Mainz
German art collectors
19th-century art collectors
1776 births
1840 deaths